Fluvio refers to things related to rivers and glacial refers to something that is of ice. Fluvio-glacial refers to the meltwater created when a glacier melts. Fluvio-glacial processes can occur on the surface and within the glacier. The deposits that happen within the glacier are revealed after the entire glacier melts or partially retreats. Fluvio-glacial landforms and erosional surfaces include: outwash plains, kames, kame terraces, kettle holes, eskers, varves, and proglacial lakes.

Landforms

Outwash Plain 
An outwash plain is both an erosional and depositional surface created by meltwater coming from the glacier. These plains are found in front of the glaciers and are typically characterized by small braided streams. The streams are usually small and braided because the sediment size varies and the original stream gets broken up. Since these streams meander around, the erosion happens laterally (left to right)  instead of vertically (up and down). These plains are usually found beyond the end moraine deposited by the glacier.

Kame and Kame Terrace 
Kames are small hills that consist of sediments ranging from sands to gravels. Intraglacial movement of water carries sediments and deposits them inside cavities, or holes, in the glacier; once the glacier melts or retreats, the kames is left behind as a deposit. These hills can range in size and be up to 50 m tall and 400 m wide. A kame terrace is a relatively flat surface of sediments that was deposited between the valley surface and the glacier. When a kame surfaces and other fluvio-glacial landforms are combined into one landscape, it is called a kame complex or glacial karst topography.

Kettle Holes 
Kettle holes are typically formed when a chunk of ice that came from the glacier is buried under fluvio-glacial sediments. Once the ice melts, the sediments fall and form a depression that can later be filled with rainwater and form kettle lakes. Kettle holes can often be found in the outwash plain of a glacier. Kettle holes can be anywhere from 5 m to 30 km wide.

Eskers 
Eskers can be describes as long, curved ridges made up of sands and gravels. These surfaces were created by intraglacial streams carrying and depositing sediments as they flow through the glacier. These landforms can range from 100 m to 500 km long and 3 m to 200 m tall.

Varves 
Varves are a depositional feature of a fluvio-glacial movement. They are layers of annular sediment deposits. The sizes of the sediments vary and depend on the volume of the streams, but are usually associated with mud deposits (silt and clay). The color and amount of the sediment deposited also varies depending upon the season; summer deposits typically have larger volumes of deposition and are characterized as being light, whereas winter deposits are usually the opposite. Winter deposits are fairly uncommon because the water is frozen into ice again.

Proglacial Lakes 
Proglacial lakes form as meltwater trapped behind a glacial feature such as an end moraine. These lakes have an intake of sediment deposited by streams within the glacier and their deposits are recorded within the varves.

References 

Glaciology
Geomorphology
Fluvial geomorphology